Players and pairs who neither have high enough rankings nor receive wild cards may participate in a qualifying tournament held one week before the annual Wimbledon Tennis Championships.

Seeds

  Gero Kretschmer /  Alexander Satschko (qualifying competition)
  Sanchai Ratiwatana /  Sonchat Ratiwatana (first round)
  Rameez Junaid /  Philipp Marx (first round)
  Alex Bolt /  Andrew Whittington (qualified)
  Marcelo Demoliner /  Purav Raja (qualified)
  Mateusz Kowalczyk /  Artem Sitak (first round)
  Pierre-Hugues Herbert /  Adil Shamasdin (first round)
  Konstantin Kravchuk /  Tim Pütz (qualifying competition)

Qualifiers

  Marcelo Demoliner /  Purav Raja
  Andreas Siljeström /  Igor Zelenay
  Ryan Harrison /  Kevin King
  Alex Bolt /  Andrew Whittington

Qualifying draw

First qualifier

Second qualifier

Third qualifier

Fourth qualifier

External links

2014 Wimbledon Championships – Men's draws and results at the International Tennis Federation

Men's Doubles Qualifying
Wimbledon Championship by year – Men's doubles qualifying